Wilder is a home rule-class city in Campbell County, Kentucky, United States. The population was 3,035 at the 2010 census. It is part of the Cincinnati-Northern Kentucky metropolitan area.

Geography
Wilder is located at  (39.047304, −84.477377).

History
Wilder was once known as Leitch's Station. It was the first settlement in Campbell County. The name Wilder dates back to a railroad station built in the mid-19th century for the Louisville, Cincinnati and Lexington Railway named Wilder station.  St. John the Baptist Roman Catholic Church was built in 1858 by German immigrants. "Wilder Station" is now located on property owned by Newport Steel. It is the home of supposed ghostly hauntings at the country music nightclub and honky tonk, Bobby Mackey's Music World, which has been called "the most haunted nightclub in America".

Demographics

As of the census of 2000, there were 2,624 people, 1,162 households, and 743 families residing in the city. The racial makeup of the city was 94.51% White, 2.29% African American, 0.11% Native American, 1.56% Asian, 0.53% from other races, and 0.99% from two or more races. Hispanic or Latino of any race were 0.95% of the population.

There were 1,162 households, out of which 28.1% had children under the age of 18 living with them, 49.5% were married couples living together, 12.4% had a female householder with no husband present, and 36.0% were non-families. 31.2% of all households were made up of individuals, and 7.1% had someone living alone who was 65 years of age or older. The average household size was 2.26 and the average family size was 2.85.

In the city, the population was spread out, with 23.0% under the age of 18, 7.2% from 18 to 24, 35.2% from 25 to 44, 23.3% from 45 to 64, and 11.3% who were 65 years of age or older. The median age was 36 years. For every 100 females, there were 82.3 males. For every 100 females age 18 and over, there were 80.5 males.

The median income for a household in the city was $49,567, and the median income for a family was $65,089. Males had a median income of $42,380 versus $35,230 for females. The per capita income for the city was $27,693. About 5.9% of families and 7.0% of the population were below the poverty line, including 12.7% of those under age 18 and 2.0% of those age 65 or over.

References

External links
 City of Wilder - Official Homepage

Cities in Kentucky
Cities in Campbell County, Kentucky